Ganga Ki Kasam is a 1975 Bollywood film starring Anjana Mumtaz and Johnny Walker.

Music
Songs were composed by Sonik–Omi and lyrics were written by Qamar Jalalabadi.

"O Mere Dil Jaani" - Kishore Kumar, Minoo Purushottam, Asha Bhosle
"Aam Le Lo Aam" - Kishore Kumar, Minoo Purushottam, Asha Bhosle
"Maa Kahega Mujhko" - Kishore Kumar, Minoo Purushottam, Asha Bhosle
"Pyaar Ka Tu Lekar Naam" - Kishore Kumar, Minoo Purushottam, Asha Bhosle

References

External links

Films scored by Sonik-Omi
1970s Hindi-language films
1975 films